Anthony Leonard Godden (born 2 August 1955) is an English former footballer who played as a goalkeeper in the Football League for West Bromwich Albion, Luton Town, Walsall, Chelsea, Birmingham City, Bury and Peterborough United.

Career
Godden was born in Gillingham, Kent, and began his career with Kent non-league club Ashford Town (Kent). He then joined West Bromwich Albion in 1977. He made 267 league appearances for the Midlands club, in addition to brief loan spells with Luton Town in 1982-83 and Walsall in 1983-84. He joined Chelsea after his time at West Brom. During his time at Chelsea he is most remembered for saving two penalties in a 1–0 win against Manchester United at Old Trafford in September 1986. Both penalties were awarded within minutes of each other but Godden saved both; the first from Jesper Olsen and the second from Gordon Strachan.

He dropped down a division to sign for Birmingham City for £35,000 in July 1987, and subsequently had spells with Bury (on loan) and Peterborough United, before dropping into non-league football. He became goalkeeping coach for Rushden & Diamonds in 2006, and also had brief spells as their caretaker manager following the departures of Paul Hart and later Graham Westley. In February 2009 he joined Brighton & Hove Albion following the exit of goalkeeping coach Paul Crichton to Norwich City.

References

1955 births
Living people
People from Gillingham, Kent
English footballers
Association football goalkeepers
English Football League players
Ashford United F.C. players
West Bromwich Albion F.C. players
Luton Town F.C. players
Walsall F.C. players
Chelsea F.C. players
Birmingham City F.C. players
Bury F.C. players
Peterborough United F.C. players
English football managers
King's Lynn F.C. managers
Bury Town F.C. managers
Rushden & Diamonds F.C.
Brighton & Hove Albion F.C. non-playing staff